Rockville station is a railroad station in Maryland, United States.

Rockville Station may also refer to:
 Rockville Railroad Station, the National Register of Historic Places designation for the former Rockville station building
 Rockville Centre station, a railroad station in New York, United States
 Rockville Air Force Station, a closed air force station in Indiana, United States
 Rockville Air Station (Iceland), a closed U.S. air force station in Iceland